7-OH-DPAT is a synthetic compound that acts as a dopamine receptor agonist with reasonable selectivity for the D3 receptor subtype, and low affinity for serotonin receptors, unlike its structural isomer 8-OH-DPAT. 7-OH-DPAT is self-administered in several animal models, and is used to study addiction to cocaine.

See also 
 5-OH-DPAT
 8-OH-DPAT
 PD-128,907
 Rotigotine
 UH-232

References 

Phenols
Dopamine agonists
Aminotetralins